Nationality words link to articles with information on the nation's poetry or literature (for instance, Irish or France).

Events
 George Whetstone joined an English regiment on active service in the Low Countries, where he met fellow English poets George Gascoigne and Thomas Churchyard.

Works published

France
 Olivier de Magny, Les Amours d'Olivier de Magny et quelques odes de luy, B. Rigaud, Paris, posthumously published France
 Rémy Belleau, Bergerie, mix of prose and verse, including Avril (a revised and expanded edition in which the "seconde journée was added);first edition 1565; France
 Pierre de Ronsard, La Franciade

Other
 Anonymous Rauf Coilyear, Scottish alliterative poem written in the late 15th century
 Luís de Camões, Os Lusiadas, Portugal
 Johann Fischart, New Eulenspiegel in Rhyme, a rewriting of Eulenspiegel into verse; Germany

Births
Death years link to the corresponding "[year] in poetry" article:
 June 8 – Honorat de Porchères Laugier (died 1653), French poet
 June 11 – Ben Jonson, date not certain (died 1637), English poet and playwright
 January 22 – John Donne (died c. 1631), English poet and Anglican cleric
 December 27 – Johannes Vodnianus Campanus (died 1622), Czech poet and playwright
 Also:
 Thomas Dekker, birth year not certain (died 1632), English playwright, writer, pamphleteer and poet
 James Mabbe (died 1642), English poet and translator
 Nef'i (died 1635), Ottoman poet and satirist
 Benjamin Rudyerd (died 1658), English politician and poet

Deaths
Birth years link to the corresponding "[year] in poetry" article:
 March 13 – Petar Hektorović (born 1487), Croatian writer, poet and collector
 March 27 – Girolamo Maggi (born 1523), Italian scholar, jurist, poet, military engineer, urban planner, philologist, archaeologist, mathematician and naturalist
 July 25 – Rabbi Isaac Luria (born 1534), Jewish mystic and poet in Palestine
 November 23 – Agnolo di Cosimo, better known as "Il Bronzino" or "Agnolo Bronzino" (born 1503), Italian Mannerist painter and poet
 December 12 – (born unknown), Loredana Marcello, Venetian poet and letter writer
 Giovanni Bona de Boliris (born 1520), Humanist, poet and writer, writing in Latin and Italian

See also

 Poetry
 16th century in poetry
 16th century in literature
 Dutch Renaissance and Golden Age literature
 Elizabethan literature
 French Renaissance literature
 Renaissance literature
 Spanish Renaissance literature

Notes

16th-century poetry
Poetry